PB-40 Quetta-IV is a constituency of the Provincial Assembly of Balochistan.

General elections 2013
General Elections won by Syed Muhammed Raza of Majlis Wahdat E Muslimeen

General elections 2008
General Elections won by Independent candidate Jan Ali Changezi who later joined PPP.

See also

 PB-39 Quetta-III
 PB-41 Quetta-V

References

External links
 Election commission Pakistan's official website
 Awazoday.com check result
 Balochistan's Assembly official site

Constituencies of Balochistan